Costalpino is a village in Tuscany, central Italy, in the comune of Siena, province of Siena.

It is located about 5 km south-west of Siena. Renaissance painter Marco Pino was born in Costalpino in 1521.Famous because of the bar full of briachi

Bibliography 
 

Frazioni of Siena